Martin Cauchon,   (born August 23, 1962) is a Canadian lawyer and politician in Quebec Canada. He is a former Liberal Cabinet Minister in the government of Jean Chrétien. He is married to Dorine Perron and together, they have three children : Charles, François and Catherine.

Cauchon was born in La Malbaie, Quebec and studied law at the University of Ottawa and the University of Exeter in the United Kingdom. He worked as a lawyer from 1985 to 1993, and from 2004 to present. Cauchon was counsel with Gowlings and with the now-defunct law firm of Heenan Blaikie. Today, he is counsel at the Montreal office of DS Lawyers Canada LLP, an international law firm. He is also a Vice-Chairman of the Canada China Business Council. He unsuccessfully ran for the leadership of the Liberal Party of Canada in 2013 as Justin Trudeau was the favourite.

Politics
Cauchon first ran for public office in the 1988 federal election when he challenged Prime Minister Brian Mulroney in the riding of Charlevoix, however he was unsuccessful in this bid. In the 1993 federal election Cauchon once again sought a seat in the House of Commons of Canada. In this election he was elected in the Montreal riding of Outremont, he was re-elected in the 1997 and 2000 elections.

Cauchon was appointed Secretary of State for the Federal Office of Regional Development - Quebec by Prime Minister Jean Chrétien in 1996. He became a full cabinet minister in 1999 when he was given the position of Minister of National Revenue. On January 15, 2002, he became Minister of Justice and Attorney General of Canada, and Quebec lieutenant. As justice minister, Cauchon argued in cabinet in favour of same-sex marriage and the decriminalization of marijuana (indeed, when asked whether he had used marijuana in the past, he responded "Yes, of course"). As a minister, Cauchon leave its marks on many files. As Secretary of State for regional development, he solidified the community future organisation in the province of Quebec. During his tenue as minister of national revenu, he introduced the customs action plan opening the door for the use of more technologies in managing the Canada-US border. As Minister of Justice, he fought for equality right and tabled the bill on same-sex marriage. He also introduced a bill decriminalizing marijuana. Even though that latter bill wasn't pass into law, it was the precursor of the legalization of marijuana.

 In 2009, Cauchon indicated he was interested in re-entering politics and running in his former riding of Outremont, which was then held by New Democratic Party (NDP) Deputy Leader Thomas Mulcair. The Liberal Party's Quebec Lieutenant Denis Coderre, who was tasked with finding Quebec candidates for the next election, announced that the riding was closed off to Cauchon and was being reserved for a female candidate. Liberal leader Michael Ignatieff originally sided with Coderre in opposing Cauchon return, and instead planned to appoint prominent businesswoman Nathalie le Prohon as the candidate in the riding. However, after facing pressure from within his caucus Ignatieff reversed his earlier decision and decide to allow Cauchon to seek the nomination, after Le Prohon indicated she would seek the Liberal nomination in Jeanne-Le Ber. The controversy over the nomination led to Coderre's resignation as the Liberal's Quebec Lieutenant and Defence Critic, saying he no longer had the "moral authority" to continue.

In the federal election held on May 2, 2011, Cauchon was unsuccessful in his bid to unseat Mulcair. The NDP's support in Quebec, and throughout most of Canada, had surged in the final weeks of the campaign, at the expense of the Liberals and Bloc Québécois. The NDP won 59 seats in Quebec and replaced the Liberals as the Official Opposition in the House of Commons. Ignatieff had also failed in his bid to win re-election and resigned as party leader days later.

Leadership

Cauchon was a Chrétien loyalist and opposed Paul Martin's attempt to force Chrétien to retire. When Chrétien announced his resignation, Cauchon was touted as a possible candidate to succeed him but did not end up running in the 2003 leadership election. Cauchon refused to back Martin's leadership bid, and decided to support John Manley. Martin was elected leader and did not include Cauchon in his cabinet. Following this he announced he would not seek re-election in the 2004 federal election.

Cauchon was considered a potential candidate in both the 2006 and 2009 Liberal leadership elections, however in both cases he announced he would not run. In 2006, he endorsed former Ontario Premier Bob Rae who placed third.

At the Liberal Party's 2012 biennial convention, Cauchon hosted a hospitality suite leading to speculation that he was interested in running for leader in the 2013 leadership election. In December 2012, it was reported that Cauchon was planning a lately entry into the race after some Liberals feared the top tier of contenders were supporting right-wing policies. On the last weekend before the registration cutoff on January 14, 2013, Cauchon was trying to gather the 300 signatures needed to enter the leadership race. Fellow leadership contender David Bertschi sent out an email to Liberals asking for their help to get enough signatures so that Cauchon could enter the contest. On April 14, 2013, he lost the leadership election to Montreal MP Justin Trudeau.

Legal-post political career
Prior to his political career, Cauchon practised law in civil and commercial litigation from 1985 to 1993. Following his exit from politics Cauchon returned to practicing law. From 2004 to 2012 he practised commercial law at Gowling Lafleur Henderson. In February 2012, Cauchon joined the firm of Heenan Blaikie in Montreal. He is now counsel at the Montreal office of DS Lawyers Canada LLP.

He is also member of numerous boards.

Between March 2015 and August 2019, he also bought from the Desmarais family the newspaper chain that he baptized Groupe Capitales Médias (Le Nouvelliste, Le Quotidien, Le Soleil, La Tribune , La Voix de l'est and Ontario-based Le Droit) and he asked Claude Gagnon to manage it for him. Faced with lower subscription rate, declining advertising rates and delays in federal government aid, it ended in bankruptcy protection and relaunched as a coop In December 2019.

Cauchon's passage in the medias happened during a very tumultuous period for the medias business. Nevertheless, he has made a contribution in modernizing the business model. He also argued for the importance of regional newspapers for maintaining a strong democracy.

Electoral record

Charlevoix

References

External links
 
 Martin Cauchon's Official Website

1962 births
Living people
Lawyers in Quebec
Liberal Party of Canada MPs
Members of the 26th Canadian Ministry
Members of the House of Commons of Canada from Quebec
Members of the King's Privy Council for Canada
University of Ottawa alumni
Alumni of the University of Exeter
University of Ottawa Faculty of Law alumni